Nu Hydrae, Latinized from ν Hydrae, is an orange-hued star in the constellation Hydra, near the border with the neighboring constellation of Crater. It has an apparent visual magnitude of 3.115, which is bright enough to be seen with the naked eye.

The spectrum of this star matches a stellar classification of K0/K1 III, where the luminosity class of 'III' indicates this is a giant star that has exhausted the supply of hydrogen at its core and evolved away from the main sequence. The radius of this star has expanded to 21 times the Sun's radius with an emission of about 151 times the luminosity of the Sun. This expanded outer envelope has an effective temperature of about 4,335 K, giving it the characteristic orange hue of a K-type star.

The abundance of elements other than hydrogen and helium, what astronomers term the star's metallicity, is about half that in the Sun. It has a relatively high proper motion across the celestial sphere, suggesting that it has a peculiar velocity roughly three times higher than its neighbors.

Nu Hydrae was a later designation of 4 Crateris.

Notes

References 

K-type giants
Hydra (constellation)
Hydrae, Nu
Durchmusterung objects
Crateris, 04
093813
052943
4232